2011 Emmy Awards may refer to:

 63rd Primetime Emmy Awards, the 2011 Emmy Awards ceremony that honored primetime programming during June 2010 – May 2011
 38th Daytime Emmy Awards, the 2011 Emmy Awards ceremony that honored daytime programming during 2010
 32nd Sports Emmy Awards, the 2011 Emmy Awards ceremony that honored sports programming during 2010
 39th International Emmy Awards, honoring international programming

Emmy Award ceremonies by year